Nerkin Dzhrapi (also, Chirpili, Jrapi, and Dzhrapi) is a former village in the Shirak Province of Armenia which was intentionally flooded by the Akhurian Reservoir. It was replaced by a new village named Dzhrapi. It contained an 11th-century caravanserai and a medieval bridge across the Akhuryan River; the river demarcates the Armenian-Turkish border.

References 
Kiesling, Rediscovering Armenia, p. 78, available online at the US embassy to Armenia's website

Former populated places in Shirak Province